David van der Colff (born 29 April 1997) is a Botswana swimmer. He competed in the men's 100 metre backstroke event at the 2016 Summer Olympics, where he ranked 35th with a time of 57.77 seconds. He did not advance to the semi-final.

References

External links
 

1997 births
Living people
Botswana male swimmers
Olympic swimmers of Botswana
Swimmers at the 2016 Summer Olympics
Place of birth missing (living people)
Male backstroke swimmers